Sepia dubia is a species of cuttlefish native to the southeastern Atlantic Ocean. It is known only from the type locality, where it was caught at a depth of 25 m.

Sepia dubia is known to grow to a mantle length of 17 mm.

The type specimen was collected in False Bay, South Africa. It is deposited at The Natural History Museum in London.

References

External links

Cuttlefish
Molluscs described in 1966